Big Brother Brasil 7 was the seventh season of Big Brother Brasil which premiered January 9, 2007 with the season finale airing April 3, 2007 on the Rede Globo television network.

The show is produced by Endemol Globo and presented by news reporter Pedro Bial. The season was officially confirmed since 2001 as part of the original contract between international Endemol and Rede Globo that provided seasons until 2008.

The grand prize was R$1 million with tax allowances, with a R$50,000 prize offered to the runner up and a R$30,000 prize offered to the 3rd place.

Overview
There were seventeen housemates competing for the grand prize, an increase over the four previous seasons. The season lasted 85 days, an increase of one week over the previous season. For the first time since the fourth season, the finale night featured a final two rather than a final three.

Ex-Housemate Exchange
When two seasons in different countries are taking place simultaneously, housemates are sometimes temporarily exchanged between them. This season was the first time that Big Brother Brasil allow other contestant of other Big Brother to stay in the house.

Pablo Espósito, from Gran Hermano Argentina 4 spent four days (March 20 to March 25, 2007) in the Brazilian house, while Big Boss winner Íris Stefanelli spent another four days (March 27 to April 1, 2007) in the Argentinian house.

Controversy
Before the beginning of the show, the announced contestant Yumi Ouchi was replaced by Flávia Viana, as Rede Globo claimed that Yumi had a contract with SBT, another Brazilian television channel, although she denied that.

Another replacement happened on the premiere of the season, when Fernando Orozco was ejected for having a friend who works as a director in the channel, which is against the rules of the show, as anyone who has any type of relationship with a Globo's employee is not allowed to be contestant in the program. He was replaced by Felipe Cobra.

After the Show
Only two months after the finale, Diego broke up with Íris causing outrage among the fans and viewers. Flávia Viana & Fernando-Luiz Bacalow married in 2007, as Alan-Pierre Miranda & Analy Rosa had a child together named Theo in 2008.

Íris Stefanelli became a personality on the country. She received a big paycheck to pose naked for Playboy. She was contracted by RedeTV! to co-host celebrities show TV Fama. Her lucrative deal was highlighted by the media. Íris is still a host on the show after the huge buzz that ensued her participation on the house

Another Housemate, Flávia Viana, became a personality too. In 2008 she was also contracted by RedeTV! to host the game show Esquenta. She also acts on Chiquititas in 2014, as the teacher Flávia. In 2017, she joined the ninth season of the reality A Fazenda, and became the winner of the season.

Housemates
(ages stated at time of contest)

Future Appearances
In 2010, Fani Pacheco was contender to be a competitor on Big Brother Brasil 10, but ultimately did not return, eventually in 2013 she returned in Big Brother Brasil 13 and finished in 6th place.

In 2017, Flávia Viana appeared in A Fazenda 9, she won the competition.

In 2020, Íris Stefanelli appeared on Big Brother Brasil 20 as a model in a activity.

In 2021, Íris Stefanelli appeared in No Limite 5, she finished the competition in 10th place.

In 2022, Íris Stefanelli appeared in Bake Off Celebridades 2, she finished the competition in 13th place.

Voting history

References

External links
 Big Brother Brasil 7
 Terra: BBB7

2007 Brazilian television seasons
07